Niamatpur is an upazila of Naogaon District in the Division of Rajshahi, Bangladesh.

Geography

It has 35299 households and total area 449.1 km2. It is bounded by porsha upazila on the north, tanore and nachole upazilas on the south, manda and mahadebpur upazilas on the east, gomastapur and Nachole upazilas on the west.

Demographics
According to 2011 Bangladesh census, Niamatpur had a population of 248,351. Males constituted 49.36% of the population and females 50.64%. Muslims formed 77.57% of the population, Hindus 18.38%, Christians 1.47% and others 2.41%. Niamatpur had a literacy rate of 44.71% for the population 7 years and above.

As of the 1991 Bangladesh census, Niamatpur had a population of 193197. Males constituted 50.37% of the population, and females 49.63%. This Upazila's eighteen up population was 98284. Niamatpur had an average literacy rate of 25.8% (7+ years), and the national average of 32.4% literate.

Administration
Niamatpur Thana was formed in 1918 and it was turned into an upazila in 1983.

Niamatpur Upazila is divided into eight union parishads: Bahadurpur, Bhabicha, Chandan Nagar, Hajinagar, Niamatpur, Parail, Rasulpur, and Sreemantapur. The union parishads are subdivided into 317 mauzas and 344 villages.

See also
 Upazilas of Bangladesh
 Districts of Bangladesh
 Divisions of Bangladesh

References

Upazilas of Naogaon District